The San Salvador Volcano (also known as Quezaltepeque or El Boquerón) is a stratovolcano situated northwest to the city of San Salvador. The crater has been nearly filled with a relatively newer edifice, the Boquerón volcano. San Salvador is adjacent to the volcano and the western section of the city actually lies among its slopes. Due to this close proximity, any geological activity of the volcano, whether eruptive or not, has the potential to result in catastrophic destruction and death to the city. Despite this, the volcano is iconic of the city, and several TV and radio antennas are situated on the El Picacho peaks and the crater of Boqueron. El Picacho, the prominent peak is the highest elevation (1,960 meters altitude).

Boquerón edifice 

The main edifice, known as the Boquerón edifice, formed between 700 and 1,000 years ago, filling up a former caldera. The crescent-shaped ridge on the northeast side of the volcano is a remnant of the caldera rim. The lavas of the Boquerón edifice contain more alkali elements and iron oxide than the lavas of the older edifice. Around 800 years ago, the present day crater was formed in a violent explosion. The crater, which gives it the present name (Boquerón means "big mouth" in Spanish) is 1.5 km in diameter and 500m deep. Within the crater around the upper walls, crops are cultivated by the locals who live on the volcano.

The magma chamber which the volcano sits upon contains a number of fissures which protrude along the flanks and sides of the volcano. The northwest (N40W) fissure has been the most active recently, with such significant eruptive events, such as the Loma Caldera eruption which buried the ancient village of Ceren and the eruption of El Playon (1658–71) which buried the town of Nexapa. The citizens relocated to Nejapa and nowadays the eruption is celebrated annually.

The most recent eruption in 1917 caused a flank eruption on the volcano along the N40W fissure. During this eruption, the crater lake inside the Boquerón evaporated and a cinder cone appeared, christened 'Boqueroncito'.

Gallery

See also
 List of volcanoes in El Salvador

References
 
 Williams, H., and Meyer-Abich, H., 1955 Volcanisim in the southern part of El Salvador: University of California Publication in geological Sciences v. 32 pp1–64
 Sofield. D., Eruptive history and volcanic hazards of Volcan San Salvador, in Rose W.I. et al., Natural Hazards in El Salvador: Bolder, Colorado, Geological Society of America Special Paper 375, pp 147–158.
 Fairbrothers G E., Carr M J., and Mayfield F G., Temporal Magmatic Variation at Boqueron Volcano, El Salvador. Contrib. Mineral. Petrol. v 67, pp 1–9 (1978)

External links

Topographical hazard zonation maps regarding the volcano and the city

Mountains of El Salvador
Stratovolcanoes of El Salvador
Complex volcanoes